William Weyman Stephens Jr., known professionally as Bill Stephens (born October 16, 1949) is an American network television host and commentator specializing in automotive and motorsports presentations. He is a nationally published author of several motorsports books and a columnist for a number of automotive periodicals. He is a television producer and writer for various automotive television programs and a communications consultant providing media training for motorsports personalities and vocal and listening skills training for business people at all levels of the corporate world.

Early life 
Stephens, the youngest of three children and the only boy, was born in Brookline, Massachusetts to William and Claire Stephens and raised in Somerville, Massachusetts, several miles west of Boston. Stephens' father was a long-distance truck driver and his mother worked in the restaurant business in the Boston area. Stephens frequently accompanied his father on various truck trips as a child which helped to fuel his interest in automobiles. According to family members, at the age of three, Stephens was able to identify every make of automobile on the road before he could even read. His parents permanently separated when he was 13 years old, and following graduation from Somerville High School in 1967, Stephens held several jobs including driving a truck, driving a taxi, making pizza, and working in local auto body shops as a body repairman and painter.

Career

Radio
As a teenager, Stephens developed a fascination with radio broadcasting after seeing several remote broadcasts presented by WBZ Radio in Boston during the rock and roll era of the 1960s. In 1972, at the age of 23, he enrolled in the Columbia School of Broadcasting, a correspondence course, and after completing the program, began his radio career at WRYT in Boston as a staff announcer and control board operator. Over the next 28 years, he served as an on-air personality at such stations as WDRC AM and FM and WCCC-FM in Hartford, CT, WRKO, WVBF-FM, WEEI-FM, WBOS-FM, and WMJX-FM in Boston, KIQQ-FM, KGIL-AM&FM, and KWST-FM in Los Angeles, California, and KMJJ-FM in Las Vegas, NV. Stephens was the last full-time air personality hired by WRKO in Boston before RKO General switched the format from Adult Contemporary to News/Talk in 1981. He was also the only music disc jockey on the airstaff to move to the new format, co-hosting WRKO's Morning Magazine program with Norm Nathan for two years.

In February 1973, Stephens was instrumental in one of the most ambitious promotional stunts in Connecticut radio history when he locked himself inside the WCCC AM&FM on-air studios in Hartford and played the Top 40 song "Bitter Bad" by Melanie for 35 consecutive hours to protest the station's reluctance to offer him a full-time job. During the promotional marathon, demonstrators assembled outside the Asylum St. facility, picketing the management of WCCC to hire Stephens. He was also interviewed on the phone during his 35-hour broadcast by Don Imus on WNBC in New York and Larry Glick on WBZ in Boston.

Stephens has been the recipient of several major broadcasting awards for his radio hosting and production, including three International Radio Festival of New York Awards in 1988–90, an Achievement in Radio Award in 1990, and National Silver Microphone Award in 1994.  Stephens is the host of the nationally syndicated Time Capsule radio feature, and has been heard on such nationally broadcast radio programs as Westwood One's Focus on Racing Radio and ESPN's RPM Radio.

Television
Stephens' first appearance on television was on local cable news television in 1982 when he served as the nightly weatherman on Cape Cod Cablevision's Cape 11 Alive News in South Yarmouth. In 1984, he was chosen from over 300 applicants to become the morning VJ on the  Boston-based music television station WVJV-TV (V-66) which was owned by former Boston-area disc jockeys Arnie "Woo Woo" Ginsburg and John Garabedian. In 1989, Stephens was named writer, producer, narrator of the award-winning automotive TV series Wild About Wheels, produced at Global Television Network in Acton, MA and aired on The Discovery Channel. In February 1994, he was hired by Diamond P Sports as associate producer of "NHRA Today" for The Nashville Network, necessitating a relocation to Nashville, TN from his home in Osterville, MA on Cape Cod. Stephens moved back to Osterville in October of that year, and after taking several radio announcer positions on Cape Cod and in Boston, he founded his own TV production company, Ultimate Garage Productions, Inc. Stephens serves on numerous automotive and motorsports television productions as a host, commentator, automotive expert, and pit reporter and has been seen on CBS, NBC, ABC, ESPN, ESPN2, ESPN Classic, Fox, Fox Sports Net, SPEED, The Discovery Channel, Discovery HD Theater, Velocity, The Outdoor Channel, The Family Channel, and HDNet. He has covered virtually every major automobile racing series such as NASCAR, NHRA, Champ Car, and the Atlantic Championship along with many specialty automotive and motorsports events such as collector car auctions, sprint car racing, tractor pulling, drag boat racing, lawn mower racing, mud bog racing, custom car shows, automotive expos, and motorsports awards ceremonies. In 1996, he wrote, produced, and narrated the award-winning documentary series "Wheels", aired on PBS affiliates around the country. He currently can be seen as an expert commentator on the Mecum Collector Car Auctions (Motor Trend TV) and is the former co-host of "What's My Car Worth" seen on the Velocity Channel. He co-hosts the series "RVing in the USA" on Motor Trend TV and has written, produced, and narrated numerous automotive and motorsports home videos in national distribution. In 2011, he researched, wrote, produced, and narrated the National Hot Rod Association's 60 Greatest Moments video to commemorate the NHRA's 60th anniversary.

Stephens served as a national event PA announcer for the NHRA Championship Drag Racing Series for 4 years between 1994 and 1997 and is a frequent Master of Ceremonies for various automotive and racing tributes, banquets, and award presentations. In 2010, he was the MC of the "Tribute to Snake & Mongoose" at the Petersen Automotive Museum in Los Angeles, California, highlighting the legendary careers of former drag racing stars Don "The Snake" Prudhomme and Tom "The Mongoose" McEwen. In 2011, he MC'ed the "Tribute to Phil Hill" at the Petersen Automotive Museum at which the great American world champion was remembered by such iconic racing personalities as Dan Gurney, Carroll Shelby, Parnelli Jones, Jim Hall, Sam Posey, Denise McCluggage, and automotive enthusiast/TV host Jay Leno.

Stephens is a six-time winner of the national Telly Award for Television Production and has won the Imperial Palace Moto Award for Excellence in Historical Automotive Television.

Publishing
Stephens has written three books for Sports Publishing, LLC of Champaign, IL. In 2002, he collaborated with legendary drag racer "Big Daddy" Don Garlits on his memoirs titled "Big Daddy's Tales from the Drag Strip". In 2003, he co-wrote a similar book with 3-time NHRA Top Fuel champion Shirley Muldowney titled "Shirley Muldowney's Tales from the Track". Also in 2003, he authored a biographical picture book on the life of drag racer Kenny Bernstein titled "Kenny Bernstein, The King of Speed". Stephens is a frequent writer of motorsports features and automotive content for such publications as AutoWeek, ESPN The Magazine, ESPN.com, Drag Racer Magazine, and Drag Racing Action. He has also served as Senior Producer for WheelsTV in Acton, MA, producing video features of new and pre-owned automobile evaluations and analysis for various automotive Internet sites such as Vehix.com, J.D. Power & Associates, Auto Trader.com, MSNBC.com, and eBay Motors.

Corporate Communications Trainer
In 1986, Stephens created a unique speaking skills program, Vocal Point, and has conducted comprehensive training seminars for such companies as General Motors, Sears, Citibank, ADP Payroll Systems, Unifirst Corporation, Cablevision of Boston, Cablevision of New York, Prime Computer, Bull Information Systems, Yankee Software Systems, Cognos Direct, American Frozen Foods, Bell South, AT&T (formerly Cellular One and Cingular), Newpro Replacement Windows, and Epsilon.

Personal life 
Stephens has been married twice. His first marriage was to Joyce Anne Carberry in Boston, MA in February 1973, soon divorcing in the fall of 1974. He remarried in 1987 to Deborah Susan Donnell in Yarmouthport, MA, resulting in two sons, Will (born April 9, 1990) and Sean (born September 21, 1995) and divorced in May 2010.  He is an avid car collector and has owned numerous collector-grade vehicles including a 1965 Shelby American Continuation Series 427SC Cobra, a 1965 ERA 427 Cobra Replica, a 1993 GMC Typhoon, 1998 Jaguar XK8 convertible, 1998 Jeep Grand Cherokee 5.9, 1994 Mitsubishi 3000GT and 12 Chevrolet Corvettes in model years ranging from 1960 to 1980. He is also a jazz percussionist and briefly enrolled in private instructions at the Berklee School of Music in Boston in 1969.

Awards

6 Telly Awards for Television Production, Writing, and/or Narration

Imperial Palace Award for Historical Automotive Television, 1996

National Silver Microphone Award, 1994

3 International Radio Festival of New York Awards 1988, 1989, 1990

Achievement in Radio Award, 1990

References

External links
http://search.espn.go.com/bill-stephens/
http://mecum.com
https://radio.tcapsule.com

Living people
Motorsport announcers
1949 births
American television personalities
Sportspeople from Brookline, Massachusetts